Kalamariá (Port Side) is among the most densely populated suburbs in Greece, located about  southeast of downtown Thessaloniki, with a population of 92,238.

History
The area was first settled by humans in prehistoric times, and remains from that settlement have been found around the Mikro Emvolo cape.

The name Kalamaria was first used in 1083 to denote the area southeast of Thessaloniki, including but not limited to the area of the present-day municipality. During the Byzantine and the Ottoman periods, the area was mostly uninhabited, except for a few fishing lodges.

The first settlement was created in the early 1920s to house Asia Minor refugees from the Greek diaspora in Georgia and Asia Minor, who fled or were forcibly sent to Greece as a result of the Greco-Turkish War. As many as 100,000 refugees relocated to Thessaloniki, primarily to the city's suburbs. Refugees from Asia Minor and East Thrace mainly settled in Kalamaria.

In 1931, an antisemitic riot, led by National Union of Greece, took place in Camp Campbell, located in nowadays Kalamaria, where a Jewish neighborhood was completely burned, leaving 500 families homeless and one Jewish resident dead.

Kalamaria has seen substantial recent growth as part of a population shift from rural and urban areas to suburban areas, particularly to those east of Thessaloniki. Between the 1981 and 2001 censuses, the population of Kalamaria grew by about 36,000 (or 69%). Up until 1943 Kalamaria was part of the Municipality of Thessaloniki. On 1 January 1943 it became an independent administrative unit.

Kalamaria had a population of 14,000 residents as recorded by an inventory in 1947, but this has considerably increased, as shown by the Greek census of 2001 where Kalamaria had a total of 87,255 residents. Kalamaria has the second highest population in the Council of the Town Planning Group of Thessaloniki but also of Northern Greece and ninth in all of Greece.

Though it was originally separated from the main City of Thessaloniki, the municipality has grown so much in the post-war period that the older physical boundaries are virtually non-existent. Nowadays, the border between the two municipalities exists purely for administrative purposes.

Traditionally the areas of Krini and Aretsou had been used as beaches and places for summer baths for the citizens of Thessaloniki, after WWII until the 1980s. The pollution of the Thermaic Gulf made this practice impossible since then.

The municipality is separated into 10 geographical districts, which have been given names reminiscent of the refugees' former homelands.

Nea Krini (Νέα Κρήνη)
Karabournaki (Καραμπουρνάκι)
Nea Touzla (Νέα Τούζλα)
Kouri  (Κουρί)
Katirli (Κατιρλί)
Aretsou (Αρετσού)
Agios Ioannis (Άγιος Ιωάννης)
Vyzantio (Βυζάντιο)
Agios Panteleimonas (Άγιος Παντελεήμoνας)
Navarchos Votsis (Ναύαρχος Βότσης, "Admiral Votsis")
Finikas (Fenekas in local language) (Φοίνικας)

Historical population

Sporting teams

Kalamaria has in total 14 sporting teams including Apollon Kalamarias.

Transportation

The main roads that feed into the municipality are those of Konstantinos Karamanlis Avenue (formerly Nea Egnatia) to the east (which links with the A25 (the Thessaloniki-Chalkidiki motorway)), Taki Ekonomidi Avenue (which links the popular district of Nea Krini with Thessaloniki's city center), Megalou Alexandrou Avenue - the biggest avenue in Thessaloniki and the EO16 which provides the main access from Kalamaria to the airport and the outer south-eastern suburbs of Thessaloniki. Other main road links exist with Thermi, while the southeast end of the Thessaloniki ring road (which bypasses the Thessaloniki Urban Area) lies to the southeast of Kalamaria.

Streets 

 Chilis Street
 Plastira Street
 Passalidi Street
 Sofouli Street
 Ethnikis Antistaseos Street
 Kerasountos Street
 Mitropolitou Kallidou Street
 Komninon Street
 Karamanli Street
 Venizelou Street
 Korai Street

 Vrioulon Street
 Sarafi Street
 Smirnis Street
 Papagou Street
 Fleming Street
 Taki Ikonomidi Street
 Panormou Street
 Andrea Papandreou Street
 Propontidos Street
 Kountourioti Street

International relations

Twin towns — Sister cities
Kalamaria is twinned with:
 Saranda, Albania
 Dimitrovgrad, Bulgaria
 Paphos, Cyprus
 Clearwater, Florida, United States
 Liptovský Mikuláš, Slovakia

Partnerships
In addition to this, Kalamaria is partnered with:
 Solna, Sweden
 Fonyód, Hungary

See also
List of settlements in the Thessaloniki regional unit

References

External links

Kalamaria Municipality home page (Greek/English)
Kalamaria - culture home page (Greek)
Kalamaria's History (Greek)
About Kalamaria (Greek)

Populated places in Thessaloniki (regional unit)
Municipalities of Central Macedonia